ReLEx Small incision lenticule extraction (SMILE), second generation of ReLEx Femtosecond lenticule extraction (FLEx), is a form of laser based refractive eye surgery developed by Carl Zeiss Meditec used to correct myopia, and cure astigmatism. Although similar to LASIK laser surgery, the intrastromal procedure is novel in that it uses a single femtosecond laser referenced to the corneal surface to cleave a thin lenticule from the corneal stroma for manual extraction and SMILE. It has been described as a painless procedure. For candidates to qualify for this treatment, they have their corneal stroma  thickness checked to make sure that post operative thickness won't be too thin.

The lenticule to be extracted is accurately cut to the correction prescription required by the patient using a photodisruption laser-tissue interaction.
The method of extraction was via a LASIK-type flap in ReLEx FLEx, but in SMILE a flapless technique makes a small tunnel incision in the corneal periphery, that does not (mostly) destroy Bowman's layer. Currently in the US the procedure is only approved for nearsightedness, but is used for hypermetropia too in other countries.

After the femtosecond laser has separated the lenticule, a blunt spatula is inserted through the incision between the lenticule and the stroma and carefully rotated to ensure that the lenticule is completely detached prior to removal by forceps.
The procedure has been described as safe and predictable in treating myopia and astigmatism.
Some theoretical advantages are that the technique is minimally invasive compared with other flap based treatments and no collateral damage occurs to surrounding tissue due to the high speed of the femtosecond laser. There are limited studies on corneal wound healing and inflammatory response after this treatment has been carried out. There is a suggestion that the expression of fibronectin which is associated with wound healing is less in this method compared with femtosecond-LASIK.
Because SMILE treatment is relatively new compared with other laser correction treatments, result studies are limited, but postoperative five year (SMILE) outcomes indicate that the results have been stable after 5 years of follow-up. In some cases post operative tear secretion and dry eye syndrome have been observed along with similar post operative complications seen in LASIK surgery.

As lenticule extraction techniques evolve, there is a possibility that extracted lenticules can be cryogenically preserved either for future donation, or re-implantation. Proof of concept has been carried out on primates where lenticules were extracted from monkeys and allogenically transplanted into other monkeys with positive results.

References

External links

 Zeiss Official Page

 [https://rexhamiltonmd.com/pdfs/peer%20reviewed%20papers%20and%20review%20articles/SMILE%20vs%20LASIK%20early%20US%20outcomes%20jcrs%202021.pdf Comparison of early visual outcomes after
low-energy SMILE, high-energy SMILE and LASIK for myopia and myopic astigmatism in the United States]

 [https://rexhamiltonmd.com/wp-content/uploads/2019/07/0319CRST_Zeiss-hamilton_Insert.pdf Frequently Asked Questions About Small
Incision Lenticule Extraction (SMILE) | Official Zeiss Publication]

Surgical procedures and techniques
Ophthalmology